Living Room is the debut studio album by American pop band AJR. It was released on March 3, 2015 by the band's label AJR Productions and was produced entirely from their apartment in Chelsea, Manhattan. The band had previously released two independently produced albums, Born and Bred and Venture, both of which are out of print.

Track listing

Personnel
 AJR – audio mixing, production, songwriting
 Chris Gehringer – audio mastering

References

2015 debut albums
AJR (band) albums
Warner Records albums